Brigadier-General Sir Samuel Herbert Wilson  (31 October 1873 – 5 August 1950) was a British colonial administrator who served as Governor of Trinidad and Tobago between 1921 and 1924.  He did much to popularise football, offering a Wilson Cup for football.

Wilson was born in Dublin in 1873, the son of Dr. James Wilson. After attending the Royal Military Academy, Woolwich, he entered the Royal Engineers in 1893. He married Marie Ada Garbarino Gervers, daughter of Francis Theodore Gervers. His sister-in-law Theodora Chevalier Gervers  married Sir Albert Hastings Markham.

References

External links
 

1873 births
Military personnel from Dublin (city)
1950 deaths
Civil servants from Dublin (city)
Governors of Jamaica
Governors of Trinidad and Tobago
Knights Commander of the Order of the Bath
Knights Commander of the Order of the British Empire
Knights Grand Cross of the Order of St Michael and St George
British Army generals of World War I
Royal Engineers officers
Graduates of the Royal Military Academy, Woolwich
Civil servants in the Colonial Office
Permanent Under-Secretaries of State for the Colonies